Jana Ina Zarrella (born Janaína Vizeu Berenhauser Borba; 12 December 1976) is a Brazilian television personality and presenter based in Germany.

Biography

Jana Ina was born in Petropolis, a city of the state of Rio de Janeiro, where she took up a number of dancing classes including salsa, mambo, ballet, jazz and samba. She had taken singing classes for eleven years and sang in a choir as a backup singer. At 15, she signed up at a modelling agency. After completing school in 1994, Jana Ina began studying journalism at the State University of Rio de Janeiro.

In 1999, she moved to Germany, where her great-grandparents are originally from. Soon after moving, she received offers to record an album. She performed at numerous beauty pageants and international events, such as the Miss Intercontinental contest, in which she served as a juror as well.

From March 2004 to March 2006, Jana Ina hosted the five-hour afternoon show Giga (formerly NBC GIGA). From 22 August 2006, she hosted the Games of the World League eSport Bundesliga.

Jana Ina married Giovanni Zarrella and has a son.

Singles
 2002: "Yo te quiero"
 2003: "Make My Day"
 2003: "Tanze Samba mit mir" (with Hape Kerkeling)

Filmography

Films 
 2004: Samba in Mettmann
 2006: Mr. Nanny (TV film, ZDF)

TV series
 2004–2006: Network reporter at GIGA
 2007: The Model and the Freak
 2008: Jana Ina & Giovanni - We're Pregnant
 2010: Jana Ina & Giovanni - Pizza, Pasta & Amore
 2017: Curvy Supermodel

References

External links

 Official website
 

Living people
1976 births
Brazilian models
21st-century Brazilian women singers
21st-century Brazilian singers
Brazilian actresses
Brazilian women television presenters
Brazilian expatriates in Germany